Seo Eun-ah (born February 26, 1989) is a South Korean actress. She graduated from the Korea National University of Arts School of Drama with a major in Acting and a minor in Dance, and began her entertainment career in 2005 by appearing in Dove commercials. In 2013, Seo beat 200 hopefuls when she auditioned three times for the leading role as a student who has an affair with her professor's husband in the film Act, for which she won the Grand Bell Award for Best New Actress.

Filmography

Film

Television series

Music video

Theater

Awards and nominations

References

External links 
 Seo Eun-ah at A-road Entertainment 
 
 
 

1989 births
Living people
South Korean film actresses
South Korean television actresses
South Korean stage actresses
Korea National University of Arts alumni
People from Incheon